Robert Laycock (10 September 1880 – 4 November 1956) was a British gymnast. He competed in the men's team all-around event at the 1908 Summer Olympics.

References

External links
 

1880 births
1956 deaths
British male artistic gymnasts
Olympic gymnasts of Great Britain
Gymnasts at the 1908 Summer Olympics
People from Holbeck
20th-century British people